Alexander Blomqvist (born 3 August 1994) is a Swedish footballer. He is currently playing for GIF Sundsvall in Allsvenskan.

Career

Club career
On 23 November 2012 Blomqvist signed a first team contract on a youth basis with Malmö FF. Blomqvist made his Allsvenskan debut for Malmö FF in a home fixture against Kalmar FF on 14 April 2013. He was substituted on 73 minutes into the game, however after just six minutes of play he had to be taken off the field due to a suspected cruciate ligament injury. After recovering from his injury he suffered an identical injury in the same knee during Malmö FF's pre-season training camp in January 2014, this meant that Blomqvist missed the entire 2014 season. For the 2015 season he was sent on loan to IFK Värnamo in Superettan.

Career statistics
As of 28 November 2018.

References

External links
 Malmö FF profile 
 
 

1994 births
Living people
Swedish footballers
Sweden youth international footballers
Footballers from Skåne County
Malmö FF players
IFK Värnamo players
Allsvenskan players
Superettan players
Trelleborgs FF players
GIF Sundsvall players
Association football defenders